Jorge Morgenstern may refer to:

 Jorge Morgenstern (footballer) (born 1972), Brazilian footballer
 Jorge Morgenstern (rower) (born 1980), Chilean rower